Aethalochroa simplicipes is a species of praying mantis found in India that was originally identified as a variety of A. ashmoliana.

See also
List of mantis genera and species

References

Aethalochroa
Insects of Asia
Insects described in 1878
Taxa named by James Wood-Mason